Jack Patrick Cullen (born 7 November 1993) is a British professional boxer. He has held the IBF International super-middleweight title since July 2021 and challenged for the Commonwealth middleweight title in 2019. As an amateur, Cullen competed in the men's middleweight event at the 2014 English National Championships.

Early life
Jack Patrick Cullen was born on 7 November 1993 and grew up in Little Lever, Bolton, England.

Amateur career
Cullen competed at the 2014 English National Championships, where he lost to Jack Langford via a points-decision 2:1 in the quarter-finals at the Echo Arena, Liverpool.

Professional boxing record

References

External links

1993 births
Living people
English male boxers
Super-middleweight boxers
Sportspeople from Bolton